The 2012 Big Easy Tour was the second season of the Big Easy Tour.

Schedule
The following table lists official events during the 2012 season.

Order of Merit
The Order of Merit was based on prize money won during the season, calculated in South African rand. The top five players on the tour earned status to play on the 2013 Sunshine Tour.

Notes

References

2012 in golf
2012 in South African sport